Trentino Bui (born May 30, 1915 in Pesaro) was an Italian professional football player.

He played for 2 seasons (9 games, 1 goal) in the Serie A for A.S. Roma and ACF Fiorentina.

1915 births
Year of death missing
Italian footballers
Serie A players
Vis Pesaro dal 1898 players
Atalanta B.C. players
A.S. Roma players
ACF Fiorentina players
A.C. Legnano players
Association football forwards